Paul George Hardyman (born 11 May 1964 in Portsmouth) is an English former footballer and coach. He was a left-back for Portsmouth, Sunderland, Bristol Rovers, Barnet, Wycombe and Slough Town.

He is currently Academy manager and assistant coach at Orange County Soccer Club who have just won the United Soccer League (USL).

Playing career
Hardyman began his playing career at Waterlooville, immediately becoming a first-team regular for the whole of the 1982–83 season in the Southern League Premier Division, playing as a winger. During that season he also appeared several times for Portsmouth Reserves in the Midweek League. He joined Portsmouth permanently in the summer of 1983, shortly after their promotion to Division Two, and was converted to a left-back.

During the 1985–86 season Hardyman represented England for the second and final time at U21 level in the European Championship quarter-final against Denmark in Copenhagen. Although England returned victorious, Hardyman lost his place for the semi-final as Mitchell Thomas of Tottenham, whom he had replaced for the quarter-final, had recovered from injury. In 1989 Hardyman was transferred to Sunderland for a fee of £130,000. While at Sunderland, he played in the 1992 FA Cup Final as a substitute where they lost to Liverpool.

Later career
Following the end of his playing career, Hardyman worked alongside Guy Whittingham as a match day summariser for Portsmouth matches on BBC Radio Solent. Until being made redundant by Portsmouth in October 2009, Hardyman coached Portsmouth youngsters between the ages of 8 & 18 alongside Whittingham, Rod Ruddick and Ian Woan.

For a time, Hardyman was manager at Sydenhams Football League (Wessex) club New Milton Town, where he also played a few matches, including being sent off on his debut. He left the club in 2011 to return to Portsmouth, assisting academy manager Andy Awford. When Awford was appointed caretaker manager of the first team in March 2014, Hardyman became first-team coach and was appointed permanently to the role in June.

Following Awford's departure in April 2015, Hardyman assisted caretaker manager Gary Waddock for the rest of the season. He and Waddock left the club in May 2015.

He subsequently joined Watford, coaching their under-12 and under-14 teams, before becoming the under-18 coach in summer 2017.

In July 2018 Paul Hardyman joined Southampton after being appointed to the position of Lead Under-16s coach in the Saints Academy.

References

External links 
 Paul Hardyman Basingstoke Town Profile

1964 births
Living people
Footballers from Portsmouth
Waterlooville F.C. players
Portsmouth F.C. players
Sunderland A.F.C. players
Bristol Rovers F.C. players
Wycombe Wanderers F.C. players
Barnet F.C. players
New Milton Town F.C. players
Portsmouth F.C. non-playing staff
Watford F.C. non-playing staff
England under-21 international footballers
English footballers
New Milton Town F.C. managers
Association football defenders
English football managers
Southampton F.C. non-playing staff
Rangers F.C. non-playing staff
FA Cup Final players